Battabara 跋陀婆羅 (a.k.a. Bhadrapāla, Baddabara, Battabara bosatsu, Battabara sonja and Kengo Daishi) is the Japanese patron deity of baths and bathing. Originally a Buddhist monk from India, Battabara supposedly achieved enlightenment whilst entering the communal bath.

Figurines of Battabara are kept in bathrooms in Japanese Zen monasteries.

References

Bodhisattvas
Japanese mythology